= The Car & Bike Show =

Automobile programme in India

The Car & Bike Show is an automobile programme in India. It was followed by similar programmes including 'A Very Ferrari Summer', 'Love Life & Lamborghini', 'Autobahn', 'Another Ferrari Summer', 'Freewheeling', 'Freewheeling: A Big Dream', and an auto quiz show called 'Mahindra AQ'.

== History ==
It is hosted by anchor Siddharth Vinayak Patankar, editor for the NDTV television station, and has been shown since 2003. In 2018 it reached its 750th episode.

== Awards ==
- 2008 NT Award for Best Automobile Show

== See also ==
- India
